Polle Eduard (born 2 December 1948, Delft) is a Dutch singer. Eduard is best known for the hit "Ik wil jou (jou alleen)".

References

1948 births
Living people
Dutch male singers
Dutch pop singers
People from Delft